The Festivali i Këngës 2020 was the 59th edition of the annual Albanian music competition Festivali i Këngës. It was organised by Radio Televizioni Shqiptar (RTSH) in an open-air venue at the Sheshi Italia in Tirana, Albania, and consisted of two semi-finals on 21 and 22 December, respectively, and the final on 23 December 2020. The three live shows were hosted by Jonida Vokshi and Blendi Salaj. Due to the pandemic of the coronavirus disease 2019 (COVID-19), the competition did not use the traditional symphonic orchestra and was not held as in the traditional location of the Pallati i Kongreseve but at the Sheshi Italia instead. Anxhela Peristeri with "Karma" emerged as the winner of the contest and represented Albania in the Eurovision Song Contest 2021 in Rotterdam, the Netherlands.

Background and format 

The 59th edition of Festivali i Këngës was organised by Radio Televizioni Shqiptar (RTSH) in order to determine Albania's representative for the Eurovision Song Contest 2021. The former consisted of two semi-finals on 21 and 22 December, respectively, and the final on 23 December 2020. The three live shows were hosted by Albanian actress Jonida Vokshi and host Blendi Salaj.

Impact of the COVID-19 pandemic 

For the first time, due to the ongoing pandemic of the coronavirus disease 2019 (COVID-19), the competition did not involve the usual symphonic orchestra and was not held per tradition at the Pallati i Kongreseve but rather in an open-air location at the Sheshi Italia. As a result of the aforementioned, the performances of the semi-final and final were pre-recorded prior to the scheduled dates.

Contestants 

Prior to the scheduled event, RTSH opened a submission period for artists and composers to participate in Festivali i Këngës between August and October 2020. On 28 October, it published a provisory list of 26 artists and songs shortlisted by a jury panel, consisting of Agim Doçi, Alma Bektashi, Eugent Bushpepa, Jonida Maliqi and Klodian Qafoku, to compete in the semi-final of the contest. On 16 November 2020, the broadcaster ultimately released all of the competing songs on its official YouTube channel.

Semi-finals

Semi-final 1 

The first semi-final of Festivali i Këngës took place on 21 December 2020 and was broadcast at 21:00 (CET). During the show, the competing participants performed the official studio versions of their respective entries. Prior to the second semi-final, the selected 18 songs to advance to the final were announced.

Semi-final 2  

The second semi-final of Festivali i Këngës took place on 22 December 2020 and was broadcast at 21:00 (CET). During the show, the competing participants performed the acoustic versions of their respective entries.

Final 

The grand final of Festivali i Këngës took place on 23 December 2020 and was broadcast at 21:00 (CET). 18 songs competed and the winner was determined by the combination of the votes from a seven-member jury panel, consisting of Andri Xhahu, Kastriot Çaushi, Prec Zogaj, Rame Lahaj, Robert Radoja, Vasil Tole and Zana Shuteriqi. Before the end of the competition, Anxhela Peristeri with "Karma" emerged as the winner and was simultaneously announced as Albania's representative for the Eurovision Song Contest 2021.

Key:
 Winner
 Second place
 Third place

Broadcasters 

RTSH provided international live streaming of the two semi-finals and the grand final of Festivali i Këngës through their official YouTube channel with no commentary.

See also 
Eurovision Song Contest 2021
Albania in the Eurovision Song Contest 2021

Notes

References 

2020
2020 in Albanian music
2020 in Albanian television
2020 song contests
December 2020 events in Europe
Eurovision Song Contest 2021